Martin Pizzarelli (born November 1, 1963) is an American jazz double-bassist known for his work with his brother John Pizzarelli, appearing on many of his albums in a swing trio that includes pianists Ray Kennedy and Larry Fuller. He has recorded one album as bandleader for Victoria Records with Kennedy and his father, legendary swing guitarist Bucky Pizzarelli. He was born in Paterson, New Jersey. He has also appeared on all albums released by John's wife, Jessica Molaskey.

Discography

Martin Pizzarelli albums

With Jessica Molaskey

References 

Swing double-bassists
American jazz double-bassists
Male double-bassists
Musicians from Paterson, New Jersey
Living people
1963 births
21st-century double-bassists
21st-century American male musicians
American male jazz musicians